"Bianca Surf / Photoni" is the debut single by Italian singer Johnson Righeira, released in 1980, under the label Italian Records.

Recording 

Recording took place at Italian Records Studios in Bologna in 1980. Both songs were played by the local punk band Skiantos. The basic track consisted of Righi on vocals, Luti Chroma on backing vocals, Carlo Capelli on synthesizer, Leonardo Grezzi on drums, Andrea Dalla Valle and Gianni Bolelli on guitars and Franco Villani on bass guitar. The saxophone solo on "Bianca Surf" was played by Michele Bettinelli.

Release 

"Bianca Surf" was released in 1980 in Italy, with "Photoni" as the B-side. It was Righi's debut single as a solo artist. "Bianca Surf" has also appeared on Righi's 2006 compilation album, Ex punk, ora venduto. The single was re-released in 1981 on the CGD label.

Credits and personnel 

 Johnson Righeira – songwriter, vocals
 Luti Chroma – vocals
 Giulio Tedeschi – producer
 Carlo Capelli – engineering
 Oderso Rubini – engineering, mixing
 Enzo Russo – cover art, photographer

Credits and personnel adapted from the 7-inch single liner notes.

References

External links 

 

1980 songs
1980 debut singles
Johnson Righeira songs
Songs written by Johnson Righeira
Italian pop rock songs
Italian-language songs